Clarembald (Clarembaud) of Arras (c. 1110 – c. 1187) was a French theologian. He is best known for his Tractatus super librum Boetii De Trinitate, a commentary on the Opuscula Sacra of Boethius.

He belonged to the School of Chartres, of William of Conches and Bernard Silvestris. He was a follower of Thierry of Chartres and Hugh of St. Victor, and an opponent of Gilbert of Poitiers.

Notes

References

 John R. Fortin (1995), Clarembald of Arras as a Boethian commentator
 David B. George, John R. Fortin (2002), The Boethian commentaries of Clarembald of Arras
Nikolaus Häring (1965), The Life and Works of Clarembald of Arras, a Twelfth-Century Master of the School of Chartres
Wilhelm Jansen (1926), Der Kommentar des Clarembaldus von Arras zu Boethius de Trinitate. Ein Werk aus der Schule von Chartres im 12. Jhd.
 Martello, C. (1998), Fisica della creazione. La cosmologia di Clarembaldo

1110s births
1187 deaths
12th-century French Catholic theologians
People from Arras